The Tillage Act 1597 (39 Eliz. 1 c. 2) was an Act of the Parliament of England passed during the reign of Elizabeth I.

Francis Bacon introduced the Bill into the House of Commons on 5 November 1597. He criticised those lords who had converted land to pasture and he lamented the decay in tillage in the country. The Bill ordered that land that had been converted to pasture during Elizabeth's reign should revert to tillage and it also banned any further conversion of land to pasture. It applied to 25 counties.

In 1601 the Act was due for renewal and was subject to debate. Sir Walter Raleigh opposed the Act, declaring that the best policy would be to set corn free "and leave every man free, which is the desire of a true Englishman". Sir Robert Cecil, however, supported the Act: "Whoever doth not maintain the plough, destroys the kingdom".

Notes

Acts of the Parliament of England (1485–1603)
1597 in law
1597 in England